The Moneytree is an independent film that had a limited theatrical release in 1992 in the United States. It received reviews in several publications such as the Los Angeles Times, New York Times and the San Francisco Chronicle.

Primarily released on video, The Money Tree offers viewers with a rare look into the life of a Northern California marijuana grower during the Reagan years; while taking a pro-pot stance. David can't find work as an actor so he uses his mountain property located outside San Francisco to grow the illegal weed. His wealthy girl friend Erica disdains David's agrarian avocation and offers him a great opportunity to work for her father, but only if he stops growing weed. David loves growing pot and so turns her down. As his latest crop slowly matures, David has close scrapes with the law and brutal drug dealers. He also frequently argues for the legalization of marijuana with his friends and colleagues. ~ Sandra Brennan, Rovi

There is no writer credited because, although the actors were given a storyline, all the dialogue is improvised.

Black Sheep Films worked on a re-release of The Moneytree on April 20, 2012 with a new soundtrack and edit.

It is believed that the film-maker really was a grower and the film is essentially a true story. Producer/actor Christopher Dienstag also appeared in the 2021 TV documentary Sasquatch talking about his time as a marijuana grower.

References in popular culture
Arctic Monkeys reference the film in their song One Point Perspective in their 2018 album Tranquility Base Hotel & Casino, noting the film for its opening scene and impressive score.

References

External links
 
 The Moneytree (film) Overview at NYTimes

1992 films
American films about cannabis
1990s English-language films